Lisa Messenger (born 1971) is an Australian entrepreneur and author. She is the owner and creative director of marketing for The Messenger Group, a book publishing company. As well as the founder and Editor in Chief of Collective Hub.

Background
Messenger grew up on a large farm outside Coolah, central western New South Wales, Australia and now lives north of Bondi Beach, Sydney.

Her first job was as a riding instructor. She graduated from a boarding school in Sydney and Southern Cross University (Bachelor of Business, 1999). She worked for several years before taking her degree. She founded The Messenger Group in 2001 in Sydney, brokering sponsorship deals and doing public relations and marketing.

Her self-help and entrepreneurship books reveal several major personal challenges as well as business success. She was married and divorced, and as detailed in her 2016 books, was engaged to an entrepreneur in 2015.

Businesses
The Messenger Group is a media company. Lisa Messenger launched it as a publishing company in 2001, and it now has 18 arms including a lifestyle website, publishing, events, marketing consultancy, and homewares. The Group has published around 400 books.  Collective was launched in 2013 with $1.5 million of her own money, as an "entrepreneurial and lifestyle" print magazine, alongside a website and events company. In 2015, Collective was distributed in 37 countries.

In October 2017, the Group announced that this flagship publication would shift from monthly to bi-monthly after "several redundancies as the business streamlines itself around the three key pillars of print, digital and events."

On 26 March 2018, Messenger announced that the print edition would close. Messenger also closed the Sydney office. Financial and creative reasons were given, and she wrote a book about the process. Several months later, the print edition was reinstated, although with one-off issues and freelance contracts for a smaller number of journalists.

Books
Messenger has written several lifestyle and business books. Most were published by her own company, although Daring & Disruptive was also published by Simon & Schuster.

 Messenger, L. 2022. Start Up To Scale Up. The Messenger Group.
 Messenger, L. 2021. 365 Days Of Kindness. The Messenger Group.
 Messenger, L. 2020. Life In Lessons. The Messenger Group.
 Messenger, L. 2019. Daily Mantras To Ignite Your Purpose. The Messenger Group.
 Messenger, L. 2018. Risk & Resilience; Breaking & Remaking a Brand. The Messenger Group.
 Messenger, L. 2018. Work From Wherever. The Messenger Group.
 Messenger, L. 2016. Daring & Disruptive: Unleashing the Entrepreneur. Simon & Schuster/North Star Way
 Messenger, L. 2016. Daring & Disruptive playbook. The Messenger Group.
 Messenger, L. 2016. Breakups and Breakthroughs. The Messenger Group. 
 Messenger, L. 2015. Life & Love: Creating the Dream. The Messenger Group. 
 Messenger, L. 2015. Money and Mindfulness playbook. The Messenger Group. 
 Messenger, L. 2015. Money and Mindfulness: living in abundance. The Messenger Group. 
 Messenger, L. 2012. Social Media to Boost Your Brand. The Messenger Group.
 Messenger, L. 2011. Books to Boost Your Brand. The Messenger Group. 
 Messenger, L. and C. Gray (eds.) 2009. Property Investing - The Australian Way. Messenger Publishing. 
 Messenger, L. 2009. Maverick Marketing. The Messenger Group.
 Messenger, L. and Z. Liew 2009. Cubicle Commando: Intrapreneurs, Innovation and Corporate Realities. Messenger Publishing. 
 Messenger, L. 2009. Happiness Is.... Messenger Publishing.

Awards
 Southern Cross University Alumni of the Year (2010)
 Thought Leaders Entrepreneur of the Year (2008)

References

1971 births
Living people
Australian writers
People educated at Ascham School
Australian women company founders
Australian company founders